The Bank of Madras was one of the three Presidency Banks of British India, along with the Bank of Bengal and the Bank of Bombay. It was established on 1 July 1843 through the amalgamation of a number of existing regional banks and headquartered in Madras (now Chennai). It was merged with the other Presidency banks in 1921 to form the Imperial Bank of India, which later became the State Bank of India.

Origin
In 1683, Governor William Gyfford (1681–1687) and his Council in Madras established a bank. In 1805, Governor Sir William Bentinck convened a Finance Committee that recommended the formation of a First government bank in India; the Madras Bank, which was sometimes called the Government Bank amalgamated Lord Krishna Bank, began functioning from 1 February 1806. It initially functioned from the Exchange Building—the building housing the present Fort Museum—within Fort St. George.

The Bank of Madras was formed in 1843 as a joint stock company with a capital of Rupees 3 million by the amalgamation of Madras Bank, Carnatic Bank, The British Bank of Madras (1795), and The Asiatic Bank (1804). Bank of Madras had a branch network spread into all the major cities and trade centers of South India, including Bangalore, Coimbatore, Madurai, Mangalore, Calicut, Tellicherry, Cochin, Alleppy, Cocanada, Guntur, Masulipatnam, Ootacamund, Nagapatnam, and Tuticorin. It also had a branch in Colombo, British Ceylon, now called Sri Lanka.

Activities
The Bank of Madras undertook all the normal activities that are common to a commercial bank. The Bank of Madras, in the absence of any central banking authority during that time, also conducted certain functions that are ordinarily a preserve of a central bank. It also issued banknotes in the Madras Presidency. These included managing the banking business of the Presidency of Madras and offices of the colonial government of India located in South India, and managing the Public Debt Office of the Government of Madras.

Milestone
The head office of the Bank of Madras was shifted to a new building, on South Beach Road, Madras, in 1897. The site was acquired for  100,000 in 1895, building was designed by Col. Samuel Jacob, and suitably modified and adapted by Henry Irwin (1841–1922), and constructed by Namperumal Chetty, a reputed builder, for  300,000. The building is an exquisite example of Victorian architecture. Currently, the building houses several offices of State Bank of India, including its main city office.

Epilogue
The Bank of Madras merged with the two other Presidency banks—the Bank of Calcutta and the Bank of Bombay—on 27 January 1921 and the reorganized banking entity took on the name Imperial Bank of India. In 1955, the Reserve Bank of India, which is the central banking organization of India, acquired a controlling interest in the Imperial Bank of India. On 30 April 1955, the Imperial Bank of India became the State Bank of India.

See also
Banking in India

References

Further reading
THE EVOLUTION OF THE STATE BANK OF INDIA, Volume 1 – The Roots 1806-1876 by Amiya Kumar Bagchi

External links
Bank of Madras

Banks established in 1843
Banks disestablished in 1921
Defunct banks of India
1843 establishments in British India
Heritage sites in Chennai
Financial services companies based in Chennai
Indian companies established in 1843
1921 disestablishments in India